Manabí is a province in Ecuador. Its capital is Portoviejo. The province is named after the Manabí people.

Demographics
Ethnic groups as of the Ecuadorian census of 2010:
Mestizo  66.7%
Montubio  19.2%
Afro-Ecuadorian  6.0%
White  7.7%
Indigenous  0.2%
Other  0.3%

Economy
Manabí's economy is based heavily on natural resources and organic products; these include cacao, bananas, noble woods, cotton, and seafood. Its industrial sector is based on tuna, great quality tobacco, and agua ardiente (Spanish brandy) beverage production. Local products include crafting of Montecristi hats (i.e. Panama hats), and furniture (rattan).

Cantons 
The province is divided into 22 cantons. The following table lists each with its population at the 2001 census, its area in square kilometers (km²), and the name of the canton seat or capital.

See also 

 Cantons of Ecuador
 Provinces of Ecuador

References 

 ManabiVende - Negocios de Manabí en Internet
 https://web.archive.org/web/20120402145740/http://www.salango.com.ec/en/salango_community-pueblo-manta.php

 
Provinces of Ecuador
States and territories established in 1824